Ifasina I is a small village and commune in the Vatomandry District, in Atsinanana, Madagascar.

It's one of numerous lost towns on the eastern coast of Madagascar.

References

Populated places in Atsinanana